Marimonas is a Gram-negative and aerobic genus of bacteria from the family of Rhodobacteraceae with two known species: Marimonas arenosa et Marimonas lutisalis. Marimonas arenosa has been isolated from sea sand from Korea.

References

Rhodobacteraceae
Bacteria genera
Monotypic bacteria genera